Big Lake is a rural community and lake of the Halifax Regional Municipality in the Canadian province of Nova Scotia on the Chebucto Peninsula.

References
Explore HRM

Communities in Halifax, Nova Scotia
General Service Areas in Nova Scotia
Lakes of Nova Scotia